Clinton Township is one of five townships in Vermillion County, Indiana, United States. As of the 2010 census, its population was 9,119 and it contained 4,281 housing units.

History
Clinton Township was named for DeWitt Clinton, the sixth Governor of New York.

Geography

Cities
 Clinton
 Fairview Park
 Universal

Unincorporated towns
 Blanford at 
 Centenary at 
 Crompton Hill at 
 Easytown at 
 Klondyke at 
 Needmore at 
 Rhodes at 
 Sandytown at 
 Syndicate at 
 Tighe at 
(This list is based on USGS data and may include former settlements.)

Cemeteries
The township contains eight cemeteries: Bono, Gorton, Hall, Jackson, Riverside, Shirley, Spangler and Walnut Grove.

Lakes
 Mc Donald Lake

Landmarks
 Sportland Park

School districts
 South Vermillion Community School Corporation

Political districts
 Indiana's 8th congressional district
 State House District 42
 State Senate District 38

References
 U.S. Board on Geographic Names (GNIS)
 United States Census Bureau 2007 TIGER/Line Shapefiles

External links
 Indiana Township Association
 United Township Association of Indiana

Townships in Vermillion County, Indiana
Townships in Indiana